Vincent Salazard (28 February 1909 – 8 March 1993) was a French racing cyclist. He rode in the 1934 Tour de France.

References

External links
 

1909 births
1993 deaths
French male cyclists
Place of birth missing